Sarah Chaari is a taekwondo practitioner from Belgium. She won the gold medal in the women's lightweight event at the 2022 World Taekwondo Championships in Guadalajara, Mexico and became Belgium's first female World Taekwondo champion. In doing so, Chaari also became the first-ever Taekwondo fighter to win golds at both Junior and Senior World Championships in the same year. The Belgian, who moved up to the senior division in 2022, had previously won gold in the 2022 World Taekwondo Junior Championships in Sofia in August.

References

External links
 

Living people
2005 births
Belgian female taekwondo practitioners
European Taekwondo Championships medalists
World Taekwondo Championships medalists
21st-century Belgian women